"On Call" is a song by American rock band Kings of Leon, released as the third track from their 2007 album Because of the Times. The song was also released as the first single from that album on March 26, 2007, in the United Kingdom. Accompanied by the B-side, "My Third House", the single peaked at number 18 on the UK Singles Chart in April and reached the top 30 in Ireland and New Zealand. In Australia, the song placed at number three on the 2007 Triple J Hottest 100 of 2007.

Track listing
7" (886970736176), CD (886970736022)
 "On Call" – 3:23
 "My Third House" – 3:56

Charts

Certifications

References

External links
 

2006 songs
2007 singles
Columbia Records singles
Kings of Leon songs